Mexico: One Plate at a Time is a television series starring chef Rick Bayless and, on occasional episodes, his daughter Lanie Bayless. The show is distributed to public television stations by WTTW and American Public Television and also airs on PBS's Create channel, with reruns on ABC's Live Well Network digital subchannel.  Filming for season twelve completed in September 2018.

Episodes
Mexico: One Plate at a Time has been on the air for twelve seasons:

Season One
Directed by Chris Gyoury
The Whole Enchilada
Let’s Talk Tacos
The Straight Cheese on Quesadillas
Sopes and Gorditas: Masa Appeal
Tacos from the Ground Up
Ceviche in the Limelight
Green Sauce and Tomatillos: Mexican Vine Dining
A La Mexicana: The Soul of Mexican Cooking
Fruit, Aguas, Ices & Paletas: The Ripe Stuff
Rice to the Occasion
Caldo de Pollo & Tortilla Soup: The Super Bowl
Chiles Rellenos and Other Cool Stuff
Fish a la Veracruzana: How to Fish for Compliments
Carne Asada: The Great Steak Out
Adobo: Chiles Cut and Dried
Beans Inside and Out
Barbacoa and Cochinita Pibil: Down to Earth Cooking
Mojo & Escabeche: The Light Fantastic
Three Hot Tamales
Seafood Stew: The Perfect Warm-Up
Beyond Chips & Salsa
Holy Mole: Mexico City
Chocolate: The Magic Ingredient
Green Mole & Pipian: Lessons of the Mayoras
Cajeta & Flan: Plaza Sweets
Pozole: The Life of the Party

Season Two
Directed by Chris Gyoury
Salsa Lessons
Pizza of the Three Cultures
A Midsummer Night’s Taquisa
Open All Night
Keeping the Flame
Craving Crustaceans
Kidding Around
Garden Spots
Dessert Oasis
That’s a Mole! An Elegant Dinner for Eight
Timeless Tamales
Cocktails at Rick’s Place
Torta! Torta! Torta!

Season Three
Directed by Chris Gyoury
Mexico’s Real Independence Day
Antojito Jones
Thrills and Chiles
Lend Me Your Ears
Tropical Cool
Hip ‘n’ Happenin’
Health in the Balance
A Sterling Birthday
Savoring Sundays
Acapulco—Jump Right In
Chorizo Hunter
Color on the Palate
The Mysteries of Chili

Season Four
Directed by Nancy Bardawil, Luminair Film Productions, Inc.
It's a Shore Thing
Fusion Revolution
Quest for Fire
The Capital of Hip
Welcome to Tequila
Mexico Unplugged
Super-Hero Sandwich
The Mothers of Invention
Go Global. Eat Local.
Archaeology for Breakfast
Muses for My Menu
Tips and Salsa
Mariachi Mania

Season Five
Directed by Chris Gyoury, Luminair Film Productions, Inc.
Eat, Drink and Be Mérida
Fresh Chiles, Hot & Cool
Mysteries of the Deep
A Pig, a Pit, and a Plan
Savoring Citrus
Tropical Sweet Tooth
Rick & Jacques. Two Chefs at Playa
Yesterday, Today & Tamales
Yucatan Snack-a-Thon
Modern Mayan
Paste Sensations
Show Me the Honey
Hacienda Renaissance

Season Six
Directed by Chris Gyoury, Luminair Film Productions, Inc.
Return to Hacienda
A Man, A Pan, Paella!
Beach Blanket Barbeque
Let's Do Brunch
Taquisa for Ten
Ice Cream Social Skills
Seafood Cocktail Party
The Whole Tamalada
Summer and Smoke
Barbacoa Block Party
Fiesta in the Fast Lane
Tequila Flights and Bites
Street Fare Tonight!

Season Seven
Directed by Scott Dummler, Luminair Film Productions, Inc.
Tacos on Fire!
Chiles Rellenos: The Stuff of Passion
Guac on the Wild Side
Salsas That Cook
Triple Torta-Thon
A Ceviche State of Mind
The Soul of Mole
The Case for Quesadillas
Confessions of a Carnita-vore
Tacos Hola!
A Whole New Enchilada
Chorizo Made Easy
Liquid Gold

Season Eight
Directed by Scott Dummler, Luminair Film Productions, Inc.
Mediterranean Baja
Tijuana Taco Crawl
Cooking on the Sea of Cortez
Presenting World-Class Wines of Baja
Eat Like a Local in Los Cabos
From Lobster to Chocolate Clams: A Delicious Feast in Magdalena Bay
Cooking in Wine Country
Tijuana Round Table
Extraordinarily Delicious Ensenada
Mexican Microbrews and Pub Fare
Sustainable Aquaculture in the Rich Waters of Ensenada
Todos Santos Magic
Baja Beach House Cooking

Season Nine
Directed By Scott Dummler, Luminair Film Productions, Inc
Oaxaca's Most Magical Holiday
Oaxaca’s Live-Fire Cooking
Off the Beaten Path in Huatulco
Artisan Mescal
Oaxaca, The Land of Seven Moles
Delicious Eco-Tourism
The Kernel of Deliciousness
Mercado Madness
Oaxacan Cheese Primer
Puerto Escondido: Living the Dream
Chocolate & Coffee From Bean to Cup
Bringing Oaxaca Home
Oaxaca’s Top Chefs

Season Ten 
Directed By Scott Dummler, Mint Media Works Productions, Inc
A Seafood Dream
A Chef’s Path
Island Time
Under The Influence (of tacos)
Mexico: It’s (a) Wine Country
Artisanal Bread in Tortilla Land
Shaking up the Margarita
How to Feed A City
A Passion for Cheese
Market Inspirations, Local Genius
Mexican Chocolate: The Next Chapter
Building a World-Class Cuisine Starts with a Sound Foundation
It All Begins with Beans

Season Eleven
Directed By Scott Dummler, Mint Media Works Productions, Inc.
The Hunt for Caribbean lobster
A Tour of Traditions
Off the Beaten Path in Playa del Carmen
Ceviches Gone Wild
Cooking Like a Local
Love of Live Fire Cooking
Baking Up Comfort
The Splendor of Yucatán’s Enchanting Markets
A Place of Deeply Rooted Innovation
Chocolate Dreams, Cacao Fantasies
Dreaming of Sustainable Agriculture
Pit Cooking, Sacred and Smoking
Examining the Yucatán’s Abundant Natural Resources

Season Twelve
Directed By Scott Dummler, Mint Media Works Productions, Inc.
A Tour of Tacos al Pastor
Chilaquiles, Comforting and Classic
Chocolate and Churros, Breakfast of Champions
Teaching Tortilla Soup
Picture-Perfect Pozole Party
Beautifully Balanced Ceviche
Tried & True Tamales
Choosing Chilles Rellenos
You Don't Know the Whole Enchilada
Crispy Carnitas
Always Time for Tacos
All in for Albondigas
Mole is Mexico's Mother Sauce

References

External links
Rick Bayless' Website

American travel television series
Hispanic and Latino American cuisine
Television series by WTTW
2000s American cooking television series
2010s American cooking television series
Mexican-American cuisine
2000s travel television series
2010s travel television series